You'll Melt More! (ゆるめるモ!) is a Japanese alternative idol girl group formed in 2012. They released their first studio album, Unforgettable Final Odyssey, on July 9, 2014.

Members

Timeline

Discography

Studio albums

Compilation albums

Extended plays

Singles

References

External links
Official website

Japanese girl groups
Japanese idol groups
Japanese pop music groups
Musical groups from Tokyo
Musical groups established in 2012
2012 establishments in Japan